Praneth Jayasundera (born 6 August 1980) is a Sri Lankan cricketer. He played 72 first-class and 51 List A matches for multiple domestic sides in Sri Lanka between 2001 and 2009. He made his Twenty20 debut on 17 August 2004, for Chilaw Marians Cricket Club in the 2004 SLC Twenty20 Tournament. His last first-class match was for Lankan Cricket Club in the 2009–10 Premier Trophy on 4 December 2009.

See also
 List of Chilaw Marians Cricket Club players

References

External links
 

1980 births
Living people
Sri Lankan cricketers
Chilaw Marians Cricket Club cricketers
Lankan Cricket Club cricketers
Sebastianites Cricket and Athletic Club cricketers
Wayamba cricketers
Place of birth missing (living people)